"Die beste Zeit im Jahr ist mein" (The best time of the year is mine) is a hymn by the Protestant reformer Martin Luther. He wrote it not as a hymn but as part of a longer poem which appeared first in 1538. In the current Protestant German hymnal Evangelisches Gesangbuch, it is EG 319.

History 
The reformer Martin Luther wrote the text as part of a longer poem of praise, not intended to be sung. The topic is firstly praise of music, especially singing, which turns to praise of God. The long poem appeared as a preface of a 1538 publication by Johann Walter, Lob vnd preis der loblichen Kunst Musica, praising the art of music. Luther's preface was titled Vorrede auf alle guten Gesangbücher (Foreword on all good hymnals), subtitled Lob der Frau Musica (The praise of Lady Music), with Music speaking. Luther's poem appears also in the Klug'sches Wittenberger Gesangbuch of 1543.

The poem is in 40 lines, rhymed in pairs without structure in stanzas, which was a typical way of narration at the time. The lines 25 to 40 were taken as four stanzas. In the first stanza, Frau Musica introduces herself. The personification of the seven liberal arts as female figures was a medieval practice which Luther "translated" to German. Songbirds are mentioned, possibly representing a peaceful natural life. Luther said in a sermon about the Sermon on the Mount which also mentions birds: "Thut doch wie das vogelein, singt, seid frohlich und lasst die Sorge, lernet glauben." (Do as the bird, sing, be joyful and let go of sorrow, learn to believe). The second stanza mentions the nightingale. The other two stanzas develop from the praise of music the praise of God as the Creator.

Melodies and settings 
The four stanzas were assigned a melody of the Bohemian Brethren, adapted to a more modern form by Karl Lütge in 1917, commemorating 400 years after the Reformation. With this melody, the song was used more as a folk song than a hymn, but appeared in some regional appendices of the Protestant hymnal Evangelisches Kirchengesangbuch (EKG). The text was also sung to a melody and setting by Melchior Vulpius. Arnold Mendelssohn created a melody in triple time and composed a four-part setting. In the current Protestant German hymnal Evangelisches Gesangbuch, the song with the Lütge tune is EG 319. Volker Wangenheim set the melody for four parts.

2017 
In 2017, remembering 500 years of the Reformation, the song was the title of a night of broadcasting by the Deutschlandfunk, focused on Luther's hymns and music derived of them. "Die beste Zeit im Jahr ist mein" was heard in settings by Ernst Pepping and Arnold Mendelssohn.

References

Bibliography

External links 
 Die beste Zeit im Jahr ist mein Projekt Gutenberg-DE
 
 

16th-century hymns in German
Hymns by Martin Luther